Hoffland is an unincorporated community in Sheridan County, Nebraska, United States.

History
A post office was established at Hoffland in 1916, and remained in operation until it was discontinued in 1927. Hoffland was a station on the Chicago, Burlington and Quincy Railroad.

The community's name is derived from Hoffland in Norway. Of similar origin is the name of Hovland, Minnesota.

References

Unincorporated communities in Sheridan County, Nebraska
Unincorporated communities in Nebraska